Christopher James Adler (born November 23, 1972) is an American musician, best known as the founder and longtime drummer of heavy metal band Lamb of God from 1994 to 2019, and of Megadeth from 2015 to 2016.

Adler played drums on Megadeth's fifteenth album, Dystopia, and performed some touring dates in support of that album, as well as the touring and creative obligations with Lamb of God. Adler played in several local bands including Calibra, Jettison Charlie, Grouser and Darker Days before founding Lamb of God in 1994. He is also a former member of the glam metal band Nitro.

Adler is well recognized for his open-handed technique, his use of the heel-toe technique, and his unusual approach to the drum kit as a left handed player on a right handed kit.

Early life and influences 
Adler attended Bishop Ireton High School in Alexandria, Virginia; He attended college at Virginia Commonwealth University in Richmond, Virginia where he met former bandmates John Campbell and Mark Morton. His influences include former Wrathchild America and current Godsmack drummer Shannon Larkin, and Stewart Copeland of The Police. Other influences are John Bonham, Dave Lombardo, Gar Samuelson, Lars Ulrich, Billy Cobham, and Gene Hoglan.

According to DRUM! Magazine, Adler describes his first drum kit as a disaster:

"The bass drum legs were different lengths so they wouldn't touch the ground at the same time. Every time I would hit it, it would wobble from left to right. The cymbal stands were duct taped together, and I think after two or three times playing the kit, the pedalboard actually broke in half because it was made of that crappy old fake metal."

Career 
In 2006, Adler collaborated with revered progressive guitarist Ron Jarzombek and began the project Blotted Science. In 2013, Adler moved to Toronto, Canada to contribute to and record the album Volition with the progressive metal band Protest the Hero. The album went on to deliver Adler his first Juno Award (Canadian equivalent to the US Grammy).

In 2014, he contributed several drum tracks to the Testament album Dark Roots of Earth. On August 9, 2014, ABC News radio asked Adler in an interview if he did the drums for the new Slipknot single "The Negative One". Adler responded with "I can't confirm nor deny it". Adler later dismissed this in a later interview.

In 2016, Adler recorded three songs with Jim Gillette, Michael Angelo Batio, and Victor Wooten in a California studio for a Nitro reunion album. As of October 2017, he left the Nitro reunion project to focus on a mid-2018 release and tour with Lamb of God.

Adler played on Megadeth's 2016 studio release Dystopia and on all live shows during the following world tour, juggling his time between Lamb of God and Megadeth. On July 1, 2016, Adler left Megadeth due to continued pressure to join full-time and leave Lamb of God. In lieu of leaving the band he started, Adler recommended his friend Dirk Verbeuren to Megadeth frontman Dave Mustaine who accepted his recommendation. Verbeuren took over after agreeing to quit Soilwork as well as his other projects.

On February 12, 2017, Adler won his first Grammy award for Dystopia which won the Best Metal Performance category at the 59th Grammy Awards. As he was no longer a band member he did not attend the ceremony with current Megadeth drummer Verbeuren attending with the band instead.

In late 2017, Adler was involved in a motorcycle accident. He revealed the details of the accident a year later in September 2018, when questions were raised about his absence from the Lamb of God tour.

On July 19, 2019, following a time period of a year where Adler was not touring with the band, Adler parted ways with Lamb of God. The band eventually announced Art Cruz as his permanent replacement. Adler scheduled multiple international clinic dates in the back half of 2019 and joined a Richmond Virginia local project with the members of Kepone. In April 2018, Adler founded Kintsugi Management, an artist management firm. Kintsugi focuses on Adler's passion for music, the artists that inspire him and employs multiple international partners.

On June 18, 2020, Adler officially revealed his new project, Firstborne, with James LoMenzo (Megadeth, Black Label Society). Their debut track, "Anthem", along with the entire EP, released the same day on all streaming platforms, with Adler pledging to donate 100% of sales to the NAACP Legal Defense and Educational Fund during the holiday of Juneteenth.

Personal life 

In February 2019, Adler announced his engagement to his longtime girlfriend. Adler is interested in animal rights and is a vegetarian.

Equipment 
Adler uses Saturn Mapex Drums, his own signature Black Panther 12x5.5" snare, and Gibraltar Hardware. He also uses and endorses Evans Drumheads, Pro-Mark signature Sticks, Trick Pedals and Meinl Cymbals. Chris helped Meinl produce the 24" MB20 Pure Metal Ride for him and helped with the creation of the 12" Soundcaster Custom Distortion Splash. He also uses a Roland pad and two Roland trigger Modules linked to a Roland TR-808 drum machine. He also uses a Roland TD30k Kit at home and for warmups on tour.

Current tour kit 
Drums – Mapex Saturn in Satin Black Maple Burl
10"x9" Tom
12"×10" Tom
16"×16" Floor Tom
18"×16" Floor Tom
22"×18" Bass Drum (×2)
12"×5.5" Mapex Warbird (Chris Adler Signature)
Cymbals – Meinl
Current:
 18" Byzance Traditional China
 14" Pure Alloy Medium Hihat
 8" HCS High Bell
 8" Byzance Traditional Splash
 16" Pure Alloy Medium Crash
 16" Pure Alloy Custom Medium Thin Crash
 10" Byzance Traditional Splash
 18" Byzance Traditional Medium Thin Crash
 14" Byzance Dark Hihat
 24" Byzance Brilliant Pure Metal Ride
 18" Byzance Traditional China

Cymbals circa 2016:
14" Generation X Filter China
16" Generation X Filter China
14" Soundcaster Custom Medium Soundwave Hihat or 14" Byzance Dark Hihat
8" Byzance Traditional Splash
12" Soundcaster Custom Distortion Splash
14" Soundcaster Custom Medium Crash
8" Classics Custom High Bell
14" Soundcaster Custom Medium Crash
16" Mb8 Medium Crash
8" Byzance Traditional Splash
18" Byzance Traditional Medium Thin Crash
24" MB20 Pure Metal Ride
17" Byzance Traditional China (Prototype)
Drumheads – Evans
Toms: EC2S Clear – G1 Clear
Bass: EMAD Heavyweight – Custom Resonant
Snare: Heavyweight snare batter – 300 snare side
Hardware
Trick Pro V pedals
Gibraltar Rack System and Clamps
Mapex Cymbal Boom Arms
Other
Roland TD-7 Electronic Percussion Module and Single Trigger Pad
Roland trigger modules
Pro-Mark TX5AXW Chris Adler Signature Sticks

Discography 

With Calibra
Demo Tape (1989, independently released)

With Cry Havoc
Demo Tape (1993, independently released)

With Jettison Charlie 
Hitchhiking to Budapest (1994, Turn of the Century)
Legions of the Unjazzed / I Love You, You Bastard EP (1996, Peas Kor Records)

With EvilDeathInc. 
Bedroom Compilation Cassette (1995, Funeral)
"Full On" Now That's Metal Compilation CD (1996, mp3.com)
Sevens and More (1998, mp3.com)

With Burn the Priest 
Demo Tape (1995, independently released)
Split with ZED (1997, Goatboy Records)
Split with Agents of Satan (1998, Deaf American Recordings)
Sevens and More (1998, mp3.com)
Burn the Priest (1998, Legion Records)
Legion: XX (2018, Epic / Nuclear Blast)

With Grouser 
Demo tape (1996, independently released)

With Lamb of God 

New American Gospel (2000)
As the Palaces Burn (2003)
Ashes of the Wake (2004)
Sacrament (2006)
Wrath (2009)
Resolution (2012)
VII: Sturm und Drang (2015)

Solo 
 Drum Nation Volume 3 (2006, Magna Carta) feat. Ron Jarzombek
 Chris Adler and Jason Bittner: Live at Modern Drummer Festival 2005 DVD (2006, Hudson Music)

With Testament 
Dark Roots of Earth song "A Day in the Death" (2012, Nuclear Blast)

With Protest the Hero 
Volition (2013)

With Megadeth 
Dystopia (2016)

With Thaikkudam Bridge 

 Namah (2019)

With Firstborne 
 Firstborne (2020, Firstborne Records)

References

External links 

 Official website
 Official Lamb of God website
Interview with musician Chris Adler on ink19.com
Interview with musician Chris Adler on Rockdetector.com
Video clips, pictures and information about musician Chris Adler.

1972 births
Grammy Award winners
Musicians from Washington, D.C.
Living people
American heavy metal drummers
Lamb of God (band) members
Nitro (band) members
Virginia Commonwealth University alumni
20th-century American drummers
American male drummers
Megadeth members
Blotted Science members
21st-century American drummers